Beacon Reservoir supplies water to the city of Beacon, in Dutchess County, New York, United States. It is located at 1,285 feet (392 m) above sea level in a hollow between Beacon Mountain and Scofield Ridge, in the neighboring Town of Fishkill, very close to the Putnam County line. It was created in 1922 by damming Dry Brook, a tributary of Fishkill Creek.

It holds . A publicly accessible dirt road, frequently used to climb the mountain, runs from the city past it to the summits. No boating or fishing or swimming is allowed in the reservoir. It is the highest lake in Dutchess County.

References

Reservoirs in New York (state)
1922 establishments in New York (state)
Beacon, New York
Fishkill, New York
Protected areas of Dutchess County, New York
Reservoirs in Dutchess County, New York